Uladzimir Ignatik was the defending champion, but decided not to compete.

Blaž Rola won the title, defeating Yūichi Sugita in the final, 6–7(4–7), 6–4, 6–3

Seeds

Draw

Finals

Top half

Bottom half

References
Main Draw
Qualifying Singles

ATP Challenger Guangzhou - Singles
China International Guangzhou